Encyklopedia PWN can refer to several encyclopedias published by Polish publisher Państwowe Wydawnictwo Naukowe
Wielka Encyklopedia Powszechna PWN - published from 1962 to 1970
Wielka Encyklopedia PWN - published from 2001 to 2005
Internetowa encyklopedia PWN, also referred to as 'Nowa encyklopedia powszechna PWN', is a free Internet Encyclopedia published by PWN